Fabrique was Fashion's 1982 second album. It was produced by Zeus B. Held. The album included the following UK hit singles: "Streetplayer (Mechanik)" which reached No. 46 in April 1982 and "Love Shadow", which peaked at No. 51 in August of the same year. "Move On" and "Something In Your Picture" were also issued as the first and third singles of the album but failed to chart. The album itself peaked at #10 in the charts, spending 16 weeks on the top 100. The track "Whitestuff" was featured in the television show Miami Vices two-hour season 2 opener, "Prodigal Son" and "You Only Left Your Picture", in another episode "Evan"

The album was re-released with additional material in 2004 as The Height Of Fashion.

Track listing
All tracks written by David "Dee" Harris except where noted.

 "Move On"
 "Love Shadow"
 "Streetplayer – Mechanik"
 "Dressed to Kill"
 "You Only Left Your Picture"
 "Something in Your Picture" (Dee Harris/Zeus B Held)
 "It's Alright"
 "Whitestuff (Short Cut)" (Dee Harris/Zeus B Held)
 "Do You Wanna Make Love"
 "Slow Blue"
 "Mutant Move" *
 "Love Shadow (Smokey Dialogue)" *
 "Street Mechanik" *
 "Do You Wanna Make Love (at  – 5:00 am?)" *
 "You Only Left Your Picture (Reggae Reprise)" *

(Tracks marked with an asterisk (*) are bonus tracks on The Height of Fashion)

'Double Play' cassette (Arista Canada ATC6604 (c)1982) contains all the above plus:

 "Dressed to Kill Double Dub"
 "Something in Your Picture (Alternative Playback)"
 "Whitestuff (The Unfinished)"

Personnel
Fashiøn
Dee Harriss – vocals, guitar, Bass guitar, Keyboards
Mulligan – synthesizer, vocals
Martin Recchi – bass guitar, vocals
Dik Davis – drums and percussion, vocals

Additional personnel
Zeus B. Held – additional keyboards, engineer
Gina Kikoine – vox (track 2)
Pete Willman – base clavinet (track 2)
Nick Froome – mixing engineer
Christian Gence – engineer
Chris Lester – engineer
Jean-Pierre Massiera – engineer
Jean-Marc Meredith – engineer
Steve Robert – engineer
Martin Homberg – engineer
Paddy Eckersley – front foto
David Bailey – back foto
David Shortt – design control
Thomi Wroblewski – front foto tinting

References

1982 albums
Fashion (band) albums
Arista Records albums